Kulak or KULAK may refer to:

Kulak, a rich Russian peasant
Katholieke Universiteit Leuven Kulak

Geography
Kulak, Sistan and Baluchestan, a village in Sistan and Baluchestan Province, Iran
Kulak-e Bordabal, a village in Khuzestan Province, Iran

Surname

Brett Kulak, a Canadian professional ice hockey player
Stu Kulak, a Canadian professional ice hockey player
Dariusz Kulak, the drummer of the Polish band Alians (band)

Fiction
Kulak (DC Comics), an evil sorcerer from DC Comics, and enemy of Spectre